Ricardo Martins Peres (born 3 April 1976) is a football manager

Managerial career
On 1 June 2016, Peres replaced Paulo Bento, of whom he was assistant, in a game of the Campeonato Brasileiro Série A, against Botafogo. Paulo Bento was suspended for this game. Cruzeiro won by 1-0.

On 20 December 2019, he was appointed as new manager of Casa Pia

On 25 November 2020, he was appointed as new manager of Busan IPark

On 31 May 2021, he resigned as manager of Busan IPark.

References

1976 births
Living people
Casa Pia A.C. managers
Busan IPark managers
Portuguese football managers